Pseudoalteromonas haloplanktis is a Gram-negative, psychrophilic marine bacterium.

References

External links
Type strain of Pseudoalteromonas haloplanktis at BacDive -  the Bacterial Diversity Metadatabase

Alteromonadales
Bacteria described in 1944
Psychrophiles
Gram-negative bacteria
Marine microorganisms